Rainie & love...? is the fifth Mandarin studio album of Taiwanese Mandopop artist Rainie Yang. It was released on January 1, 2010 by Sony Music Taiwan. Two editions of the album were released: pre-order edition and Rainie & love...?  (Celebration Edition) with different issues for Taiwan and Hong Kong. Its Japanese version was also issued for the Japanese market.

The tracks "雨愛" (Rainie Love) is the ending theme; and "青春鬥" (Youth Bucket), "匿名的好友" (Anonymous Friend), and "In Your Eyes", a duet with Show Lo, are insert songs of Taiwanese drama Hi My Sweetheart, starring Show Lo and Yang. "In Your Eyes" also included in Show Lo's 7th studio album Rashomon under his label Warner Music Taiwan.

The tracks "雨愛" (Rainie Love) and "匿名的好友" (Anonymous Friend) are listed at number 22 and number 69 respectively, on Hit Fm Taiwan's Hit Fm Annual Top 100 Singles Chart (Hit-Fm年度百首單曲) for 2010. The album is tied fifth best selling album in Taiwan in 2010, with 50,000 copies sold, with To Hebe by Hebe Tien of S.H.E.

Track listing
 "雨愛" Yu Ai (Rain Love) - Hi My Sweetheart ending theme song - 4:20
 "In Your Eyes" - feat Show Lo - Hi My Sweetheart insert song - 4:29; cover of In Your Eyes by Cool (South Korean band) 
 "青春鬥" Qing Chun Dou (Youth Bucket) - Hi My Sweetheart insert song - 2:58  
 "調皮的愛神" Diao Pi De Ai Shen (Naughty Cupid) - 4:55  
 "摺疊式愛情" Zhe Die Shi Ai Qing (Foldable Love) - 4:04  
 "匿名的好友" Ni Ming De Hao You (Anonymous Friend) - Hi My Sweetheart insert song - 4:22  
 "要我的命" Yao Wo De Ming (It's Killing Me) - 3:39
 "絕對達令" Jue Dui Da Ling (Absolute Darling) - 4:07 
 "新流感" Xing Liu Gan (New Flu) - 3:26
 "二度戀愛" Er Du Lian Ai (Love for the Second Time) - 3:49

Music videos
 "雨愛" (Rainie Love) MV
 "In Your Eyes" MV - feat Show Lo
 "絕對達令" (Absolute Darling) MV
 "匿名的好友" (Anonymous Friend) MV
 "青春鬥" (Youth Bucket) MV

References

External links
  Rainie Yang@Sony Music Taiwan
  Rainie Yang discography@Sony Music Taiwan

2010 albums
Rainie Yang albums
Sony Music Taiwan albums